Leipers Fork Historic District is a  historic district in Leipers Fork, Tennessee that was listed on the National Register of Historic Places in 1998.  The area has also been known as Benton Town and as Hillsboro.

It includes Queen Anne and Bungalow/Craftsman architecture.

When listed, the district included 54 contributing buildings and 21 non-contributing buildings. The eligibility of the property for NRHP listing was addressed in a 1988 study of Williamson County historical resources.

References

Historic districts in Williamson County, Tennessee
Queen Anne architecture in Tennessee
American Craftsman architecture in Tennessee
Bungalow architecture in Tennessee
Historic districts on the National Register of Historic Places in Tennessee
National Register of Historic Places in Williamson County, Tennessee